One Shenton Way is a high end real estate redevelopment project with 341 apartments  along Shenton Way in the Tanjong Pagar area of Singapore.  It consists of two towers, the tallest of which is 50 stories.  It was completed in 2011 and is notable for its two tower construction. Two sides of each tower is clad in gold and two sides in blue glass panels. The first floor is retail space and includes a convenience store, a wine bar, cafes and award winning restaurants. The car park has 383 lots and is available to both residents and non residents at competitive rates.

New facilities were added over the years catered to families and long term residents. One Shenton is the only high rise building in Singapore that is fitted with biometric entrance access at all entry points, increasing safety and eliminating the need for residents to carry access cards.

Facilities

Lobby (Ground Level)
 Concierge
 Lounge
 First high rise condo in Singapore with Biometrics access

Club Level (Level 8 )
 Indoor Kids room
 Lap Pool
 Leisure Pool
 Jet Pool
 Wading Pool
 Bridge Lounge
 Landscape Feature Pond
 Social Patio
 Sun Deck
 Cabanas
 Function Room
 Entertainment Terrace
 Outdoor Gourmet Cooking
 Lounge/Refreshment/Juice Bar
 Games Rooms + Pool/Billiard Room
 Library
 Outdoor Reading
 Laundry Room

Wellness Level (Level 24 & 25)
 Sky Gym
 Sky Lounge
 Spa Garden
 Spa Lounge
 Outdoor Exercise Terrace
 Relaxation Alcove
 Yoga Terrace

References

External links
 One Shenton Complex, retrieved 2013-04-02
 Information on building foundation, retrieved 2009-11-18
 One Shenton Details and Location
Twin towers
City Developments Limited
Residential skyscrapers in Singapore
2011 establishments in Singapore